Tadeusz Zagajewski (16 December 1912, in Lwów – 28 September 2010) was a Polish electronic engineer, professor (since 1954) and honoris causa of Silesian University of Technology.  He was a member of the Polish Academy of Sciences (corresponding member since 1960; full member since 1976), and honorable member of Polish Society of Theoretical and Applied Electrical Engineering. He is the author of works mainly about electrical network theory.

Notes

References
 
 

1912 births
2010 deaths
Polish electronics engineers
Members of the Polish Academy of Sciences
Engineers from Lviv
Recipients of the Order of Polonia Restituta (1944–1989)